Count Johann Adam von Questenberg (baptized 24 February 167810 May 1752) was an Austrian nobleman, Reichshofrat, amateur musician, and patron of the arts. He was a councilor of the Imperial Court in Vienna from 1702 to 1735. He organised concerts at his palaces in Vienna and Jarmeritz, and commissioned compositions by contemporary composers. He made his palace a music centre of Central Europe.

Biography 
Questenberg was baptised in Vienna, as the son of Count Johann Anton (1633–1686) and his wife, Baroness Maria Katharina von Stadel (b. 1641). He was coming from the Cologne branch of the noble . His paternal grandfather, entered the service of the Habsburgs, thereby acquiring several Herrschaften (domains) in Bohemia, Moravia and Lower Austria, including . Questenberg's father chose this palace for his headquarters.

Questenberg studied philosophy in Vienna (1692–1694), and jurisprudence in Prague (1694–1696). Upon graduating, he received the title of Graf (Count) in 1696. In 1702, after spending three years taking his "Grand Tour" through Europe, he came to the Imperial Court in Vienna, in the capacity of a councilor. He was promoted to Reichshofrat in 1706, becoming a Privy Councilor and Chamberlain in 1723. His Viennese palace, now known as the Questenbergpalais, and mansions were all expanded in Baroque style.

During his stay in Vienna, he organized concerts at his palace. After 1722, he also held performances at the palace theatre in Jarmeritz. There, he maintained a permanent musical ensemble, with his own composers, twenty vocalists, and seventy instrumentalists, who also took part in church music and school concerts. By the 1730s, his palace had become a national music centre.

Questenberg himself was an amateur composer and musician, playing the lute and theorbo; only two pieces of his have survived. He was also an enthusiastic collector of music; commissioning numerous works by contemporary composers. In addition, he maintained correspondence with Antonio Vivaldi and Johann Sebastian Bach. He may have met Bach in Karlsbad, where he had accompanied the court music director, Prince Leopold von Anhalt-Köthen, in 1718 and 1720. There is also evidence of a professional contact with Bach, through a middleman, in 1749. The Bach scholar Michael Maul suggested that Questenberg may have commissioned the Mass in B minor.

Questenberg was married twice; to Countess Maria Antonia von Waldburg-Friedburg-Scheer (1691–1736) in 1707, and to Countess Maria Antonia von  (1708–1778) in 1738. There were six children from his first marriage, but only one daughter, Maria Carolina (1712–1750), reached adulthood. He appointed , his second wife's nephew, as heir to his properties and title. He died in Jarmeritz.

References

Further reading

External links 

 
 
 Perutkovà, Jana: Der glorreiche Nahmen Adami – Johann Adam Graf von Questenberg (1678–1752) / Johann Adam Graf von Questenberg (1678–1752) als Förderer der italienischen Oper in Mähren (in German) Doblinger
 Questenberg, John Adam (in German) LMU August 2021
 Ansicht des Palais Questenberg-Kaunitz in Wien, Kupferstich, um 1750? deutschefotothek.de

1678 births
1752 deaths
Austrian noble families
Counts of Austria
Austrian patrons of music
Austrian lutenists
Nobility from Vienna